Ernest Mesmin Lucien Cabo (15 December 1932 in Sainte-Rose, Guadeloupe – 28 November 2019 in Basse-Terre) was the Roman Catholic bishop of the Diocese of Basse-Terre in Guadeloupe from 1984 to 2008.

Cabo was ordained a priest in 1964 and on 2 July 1984 succeeded Siméon Oualli as the bishop of Basse-Terre. He retired on 15 May 2008 and was succeeded by the bishop of Pontoise, Jean-Yves Riocreux, who was appointed bishop of Basse-Terre in June 2012 and took up the post in September 2012.

References

External links
Diocese of Basse-Terre, Guadeloupe 
Catholic Hierarchy: Ernest Cabo 

1932 births
2019 deaths
People from Sainte-Rose, Guadeloupe
20th-century Roman Catholic bishops in Guadeloupe
21st-century Roman Catholic bishops in Guadeloupe
Roman Catholic bishops of Basse-Terre